Tarapacá is a town and municipality in the Colombian Department of Amazonas.

The town is served by Tarapacá Airport.

History
Originally founded by Peruvian refugees from the War of the Pacific, it was awarded to Colombia after the Salomón-Lozano Treaty. These refugees would later resettle in the settlement of the same name in northern Peru.

Places with the same name
 Nuevo Tarapacá, Peru
 San Lorenzo de Tarapacá, Chile
 Tarapacá Region, Chile

See also
Peru-Colombia War
War of the Pacific

References

External links
 Government of Amazonas Department, Tarapacá

Municipalities of Amazonas Department
Populated places established in 1909
1909 establishments in Colombia
Road-inaccessible communities of Colombia